Stone Bluff is an unincorporated community in Van Buren Township, Fountain County, Indiana.

History
A post office was established at Stone Bluff in 1869, and remained in operation until it was discontinued in 1956.

Geography

References

Unincorporated communities in Fountain County, Indiana
Unincorporated communities in Indiana